Máriapócs is a small town in Szabolcs-Szatmár-Bereg county, in the Northern Great Plain region of eastern Hungary. It lies near Nyíregyháza. It is an important place for pilgrimage. It has a Byzantine Catholic church, which houses the Weeping  Madonna, an enormous ornate iconostasis that now takes pride of place above the altar. This icon is not the original, but an 18th-century copy. The original one is kept in St. Stephen's Cathedral in Vienna.

The History of Máriapócs 
Before the end of the seventeenth century Pócs only received mention in the written sources a few times. The first reference was in a document from 1280 that mentions a place called “Polch,” over which the members of the Hont-Pazmány family were disputing. During the fourteenth century, the Gutkeled family purchased Pouch, or Powch. Later, the Bathory family acquired the village, and it became a part of the Ecsed property. While the population was Hungarian during the Middle Ages, beginning with the middle of the seventeenth century a portion of the Ruthenians, spreading South from the Northeastern counties, such as Zemplén, Sáros, Ung, also settled at Pócs. By the end of the century, the Ruthenians constituted the majority. This fundamentally changed the ratio of the denominations in the town, and from that point on, the Byzantine Catholics became the majority. In addition to them, Latin Catholics and smaller numbers of Reformed and Lutherans also live in the settlement.

Pócs acquired a national and international reputation in 1696. During the Sunday Liturgy on 4 November in the wooden church of the Byzantine Catholics, a peasant named Mihály Eöry noticed that tears flowed from the eyes of the Icon of the Theotokos on the iconostasis. He drew the attention of Cantor János Molnár and then the rest of those present to the extraordinary sight. The weeping continued with varying intensity until 8 December and then stopped. The news of the inexplicable phenomenon soon spread beyond the village to the neighboring settlements. The imperial general stationed at the town of Kálló, which was near to Pócs and served as the center of local administration, Count Johannes Andreas Corbelli rode out, accompanied by his officers, to Pócs in order to see the Weeping Mary icon. Taking the painting into his own hands and carefully examining it, he became personally convinced that there was no fraud, as the tears also fell copiously from the eyes of the Mother of God, when he was holding the icon in his hands. He soaked up the tears with his handkerchief. Later, when he reported to the Emperor Leopold and the Empress Eleonora on the incident, he took his handkerchief to Vienna with him.

Almost simultaneously with Corbelli’s visit, Jakab Kriegsmann the priest of Kálló also saw the miraculous phenomenon and notified Cardinal Leopold Kollonich, the Archbishop of Esztergom, as well as his own superior, György Fenesi, the Bishop of Eger. Already at that time it was noted that the icon should not remain in the wooden church of the completely insignificant village of Pócs. The bishop of Eger György Fenesi ordered an investigation, which was carried out by his vicar Grand Provost András Pettes during the last days of 1696 and the first days of 1697. The official record of the investigation, which is today housed in the Archive of the Eötvös Loránd University, contains the testimony of thirty-six witnesses, including those of Reformed and Lutheran soldiers, as well as the sworn written deposition of General Corbelli. We can learn details about the origins of the Icon of Theotokos from the testimony of the eighth witness, Judge László Csigri. According to Csigri, he had ordered the painting around 1675 from István, the younger brother of the parish priest Dániel Papp. The negotiated price of six forints, however, was considered to be excessive by Csigri’s parents, and so the painting was bought and donated to the church by another inhabitant of Pócs, Lőrinc Hurta.

The picture was a tempera painting by István Papp onto a 50x 70 cm maplewood tablet. Painted with relatively simple strokes, the icon belongs to the so-called Hodigitria (the Guide) icons. Mary holds the baby Jesus on her left arm and points to him with her right hand: He is the Way. On the lower part of the icon one can read in Cyrillic letters, “As a servant of God, I have presented this picture to atone for my sins.”

As a result of the official investigation, and perhaps even more as a result of the unambiguous testimony of General Corbelli, the Emperor Leopold, in March 1697, formally directed György Fenesi, the Bishop of Eger, to send the Weeping Icon of Pócs to Vienna. This decision led to strenuous resistance, not just on the part of the inhabitants of Pócs, but by the entire population of the country. During these years, a significant part of the country, and most especially Northeastern Hungary could be considered a war zone. The housing and provisioning of the imperial forces participating in the war of liberation from the Turkish occupation imposed enormous burdens on the population. The frequent violence of the housed soldiers further undermined the mood of the country, and as a result an anti-Habsburg uprising broke out at Hegyalja at that time. When the soldiers appeared to take away the Pócs icon, the locals and the pilgrims felt that once again those in power were stealing from them.

The forcible removal of the Pócs icon to Vienna was transformed into an affront to the entire nation. In the declaration of the program of the Rákóczy uprising (1703-1711), Recrudescunt diutina Inclytae Gentis Hungarae vulnera …, the ninetieth of the one hundred grievances was the “removal and failure to return” the Pócs painting.

The process of carrying the Weeping Icon to Vienna lasted for five months. The route touched the towns of Tokaj, Bárca, Kassa, Eger, Pest, Buda and Győr. At these places the picture was publicly exhibited, several copies were made, and Liturgies were celebrated in front of it. The Icon arrived in Vienna on 4 July 1697, where with the leadership of Archbishop Ernst von Trautman 300,000 people received it. At first, the picture was taken to the ruling couple in the Favorita Palace, then it was exhibited in the larger churches of the city for three days each. A famous orator of the day, Abraham a Santa Clara, delivered a memorable sermon on 8 August in which he placed the icon in the context of the war against the Turks. From that point on the prayer for the intercession of the Weeping Icon of the Pócs Virgin Mother became an important element in the struggle against the Turks. The decisive victory over the Turks at Zenta on 11 September 1697 was interpreted by public opinion obviously to have been due to the intercession of the Virgin Mother of Pócs. The victory at Zenta further strengthened the cult of the Icon of Pócs in Vienna. In December 1697, on the First Sunday of Advent, the Icon was placed permanently in the St. Stephen’s Cathedral, where due to the intensity of the cult, soon a copy had to be put on display, and the original was only displayed on special occasions or holidays. In 1946, the copy was stolen and since then the original icon has been located on the altar of the southern side of the nave of the Stephansdom. Although the intensity of the Viennese adoration of the Icon of Pócs, “unsere Liebe Frau von Wien,“ has not decreased over the centuries, the miracle of the weeping has not been repeated.

Despite the transference of the weeping Icon to Vienna the attention directed at Pócs did not decline. The little wooden chapel became a pilgrimage site because the pilgrims considered the place of the weeping to be a place selected and blessed by God, independently from the Icon. The fact that the picture no longer shed tears in Vienna further strengthened this view. The place of the Icone of the Weeping Theotokos remained empty for years. Then, probably as the gift of the Bishop of Eger István Telekessy, a copy was put in its place. The artist is unknown. The ever larger mass of pilgrims arriving in the settlement engulfed the simple wooden church, which was not in particularly good condition. Already in 1701, some suggested that a collection should be taken up throughout the country for the renovation of the church. Mátyás Mészáros, an inhabitant of Pócs, received permission from Emperor Leopold to make the collection. We do not know how the fundraising drive went. The restoration of the wooden church may have been the result. It is, however, certain that during the years that followed the church authorities began to consider the building of a new church and a Basilian monastery.

In 1714, János József Hodermárszky, elected Bishop of Munkács, made such a recommendation at the Vienna court but due to the delayed opinion of the Bishop of Eger the initiative did not prove to be successful. Nevertheless, during the following year the attention focused on Pócs increased. On 1 August 1715 during the morning liturgical service celebrated by priest Mihály Pap, the cantor János Molnár began to notice that the eyes of the copy placed on the spot of the original Icon began to shed tears. Even on the following day and on the 5th the weeping was witnessed by several dozen people. The priest notified bishop György Bizánczy Gennadius, who was staying in Kálló and the Bishop of Eger Gábor Antal Erdődy, who assigned János Kiss, Grand Provost of Eger, to investigate the weeping. This inquiry also ended with the conclusion that the miracle was real, and that there was no sign of any manipulation. In a letter of 19 September 1715, the Bishop of Eger recognized the miracle as fact and declared the settlement to be a saint shrine, which now became known as Máriapócs. Although the construction of a new church became ever more urgent after the second weeping and the designation as a saint shrine, the competition for the position of Bishop of Munkács between József Hodermárszky and György Bizánczy Gennadius delayed the plans. Simultaneously, the peculiar situation of the Eparchy of Munkács in canon law, according to which the Byzantine Catholic Bishop of Munkács is the vicar in ritual matters to the Bishop of Eger made the execution of the plans even more difficult. Being subordinate to the Bishop of Eger also meant that the Bishop of Munkács could only build a new church in the diocese with the permission of the Bishop of Eger. The Bishop of Eger, however, in this matter kept the interests of the nearby Minorite church at Nyírbátor, which was only a few kilometers away, firmly in sight. The question of building a church in Pócs only returned to the forefront after the death of Hodermárszky in 1729.

During the last days of 1730, György Gennadius Bizánczy initiated negotiations with Nikodémus Licky, a master builder of Kassa, on the building of a new church at Pócs. The Szepes Chamber and a representative of the Aspermont family, which had local feudal jurisdiction, joined the negotiations. They agreed that the church, which was to be constructed, had to be built in light of the needs of the Byzantine rite. Bishop Bizánczy sent the plans, which had been drawn up by Liczky, to the Bishop of Eger Gábor Antal Erdődy. With his approval the construction began in the spring of 1731. The first phase took two years. In 1733, bishop Bizánczy died, and during the years that his successor, Simon Olsavszky, Bishop of Munkács (1733-1737), was in office no progress was achieved. The work was continued during the time of bishop György Gábor Blazsovszky (1738-1742), who signed a new contract with Liczky. Only the side walls were, however, completed in the lifetime of the bishop. The church was finally finished by bishop Mihály Mánuel Olsavszky (1743-1767), who reinvigorated the work starting in 1744. Not only was the church completed and consecrated by 1749 but in the same year the construction of the Basilian monastery began. Nikodémus Liczky, the master builder of the church, was commissioned by Bishop Olsavszky to build it. Since the settlement of the Basilians in Pócs was against the interests of the Franciscans in Nyírbátor, in 1751 the construction of the monastery stopped, and the first Basilian monks could only settle two years later. They assumed responsibility for the shrine church. The first internal painting of the church began in 1748-1749. Bishop Olsavszky gave the commission to István Vörös, a painter from Kassa. The decorative paintings he made were painted over at the end of the nineteenth century. However, during the renewal under the leadership of József Boksay in 1940, several of its elements were restored, or repainted. The monumental “panneau” depicting the Cult of the in Hungary, which decorated the wall of the Sanctuary, was created at this time by Manó Petrasovszky. In 1748, bishop Olsavszky commissioned a Greek master craftsman, named Constantine, to create the iconostasis of the shrine church. He completed the thirteen meter tall and six meter wide work, richly decorated with carvings, in less than eight months. The painters of the earliest pictures are unknown. In 1785, the basilian painter Mihály Spalinszky was entrusted with the creation of the icons of the iconostasis. Most of the icons he painted were removed by the Spisák brothers, who created the new pictures in 1896, and only five remain. The Saint Icon was placed above the central beautiful gates of the iconostasis. The new holy altar on the left side of the nave was finished with the assistance of the Franciscan masters at Pécs in 1946. The design allows the pilgrims to approach the Saint Icon from the courtyard of the church and without disturbing the services in the church. The new pilgrimage church is able to accommodate much larger numbers of pilgrims. Under the guardianship of the Basilian monks, the Saint Shrine has become the most important pilgrimage site in Eastern Hungary. This made the nineteenth-century expansion possible and necessary. In 1856, the church towers were raised one level, and in 1896 the interior of the church was renewed.

The third weeping of the Icon, and until now the last, occurred on 3 December 1905. Kelemen Gávris, Basilian monk, noticed that the face of the Virgin Mother was darker than usual, and a line of tears flowed down her face from the right eye, which ended in a teardrop. The weeping was continuous until 19 December, and then on the last two days of December, a total of eighteen days. The committee investigating the events determined that the weeping had been real.

The ceremonial services commemorating the 250th anniversary of the first weeping and the 300th anniversary of the Union of Ungvár took place under the leadership of Cardinal József Mindszenty, the later witness to the faith, in the presence of 250,000 pilgrims on 8 September 1946. The ceremonial procession took place at the beginning of a new era, which would bring many trials for the religious.

In 1948, the pilgrimage church received a designation of “basilica minor” from Pope Pius XII but two years later the Basilian monks were expelled from the monastery by the communist authorities and in their place the building was used to house people with psychological ailments. The subsequent pilgrimages were carried out under strict police supervision, and Máriapócs became inaccessible for the pilgrims of neighboring countries. Nevertheless, the significance of the customary processions did not change. All those who were afraid to display their religious identities in the vicinity of their carefully supervised homes often found their way to the sacraments in the safety of the multitudes. The collapse of communism in 1989-1990 brought important changes in the life of the Saint Shrine. Máriapócs was a significant place of celebration during the visit of Pope John Paul II to Hungary in 1991. After several decades it once again became possible to visit as pilgrims in organized groups, and, in 1999, a pilgrimage house was built to accommodate them. The Basilian fathers and sisters were allowed to return to Máriapócs. The infrastructural improvements, which had been neglected during the communist era, are currently underway. The external and internal renovation of the shrine church, as well as the improvement of the basilica’s surroundings, were accomplished with European Union funds during 2008-2010.

See also
 Hungarian Greek Catholic Church

References

Sources
 
 
Tamás Véghseő - Szilveszter Terdik, “…you have foreseen all of my paths…”: Byzantine Rite Catholics in Hungary, Strasbourg: Éditions Du Signe, 2012.

External links
The Shrine of Máriapócs - The Carpathian Connection 
 Official Site of the Sanctuary of Máriapócs
 Official Site of the Hungarian Greek Catholic Church
 Our Lady of Mariapócs on "All About Mary" The University of Dayton's Marian Library/International Marian Research Institute (IMRI) is the world's largest repository of books, artwork and artifacts devoted to Mary, the mother of Christ, and a pontifical center of research and scholarship with a vast presence in cyberspace.

Populated places in Szabolcs-Szatmár-Bereg County